Dharashiv Tahsil is a tahsil/taluka (subdistrict) in Dharashiv district, Maharashtra on the Deccan Plateau of India. The town of Dharashiv is the administrative headquarters of the tahsil. There are 110 panchayat villages in Osmanabad Tahsil. 

Outside the city of Dharashiv, the tahsil is divided into five revenue circles: Bembli Dhoki, Dharashiv Dharashiv (rural), Padoli and Ter.

Demographics
In the 2001 Indian census, Dharashiv Tahsil had a population of 359,234, with 187,063 (52.1%) males and 172,171 (47.9%) females, for a gender ratio of 920 females per thousand males.

In the 2011 census, Dharashiv Tahsil had 406,647 inhabitants, or 24.5% of the total district population. It had a gender ratio of 920 females per thousand males. The tahsil was 72.4% rural. The literacy rate in 2011 was 79.65% overall in Osmanabad Tahsil, with a rate of 87.65% for males and 71.03% for females. In 2011 in Osmanabad Tahsil, 12.1% of the population was 0 to 6 years of age.

References 

Osmanabad district
Talukas in Maharashtra